Karin Knapp was the defending champion, but withdrew before the tournament began.

Kiki Bertens won the title, defeating Mariana Duque Mariño in the final, 6–2, 6–2.

Seeds

Draw

Finals

Top half

Bottom half

Qualifying

Seeds

Qualifiers

Lucky losers

Draw

First qualifier

Second qualifier

Third qualifier

Fourth qualifier

Fifth qualifier

Sixth qualifier

References 
 Main draw
 Qualifying draw

Nurnberger Versicherungscup Singles
2016 Singles
Nurnberger Versicherungscup Singles